This is a list of Japanese papers and names of washi.  All these washi are still made today.

A
 Awa Aizomegami (阿波藍染紙)
 Awajigami
 Awagami (阿波紙) or Awawashi (阿波和紙)

B
 Bashōshi (芭蕉紙)
 Bitchū Torinokogami (備中鳥子紙)
 Birutangami (蛭谷紙)

C
 Chigusagami
 Chirimen (縮緬) or Chirimengami(縮緬紙) cf.縮緬本 
 Chochingami (提灯紙)

D
 Danshi

E
 Etchu washi (越中和紙) 
 Etchu Katasomegami
 Echizen Bijutsu Kogeishi
 Echizen Hoshoshi (越前奉書紙)
 Echizen Torinokogami (越前鳥子紙)
 Edo Chiyogami (江戸千代紙)
 Edo Karakami (江戸からかみ)

G
 Gokayama-gami

H
 Haigushi
 Honminogami
 Hosokawagami (細川紙)

I
 Inshu Gasenshi
 Ise-katagami
 IseWashi (伊勢和紙)
 Iyo Hoshoshi
 Izumo Mingeishi

J
 Jumonjigami

K
 Kadodegami
 Kaga Ganpishi
 Kaga Hoshoshi
 Kairyo Hanshi
 Kamikawasakigami
 Kamogami
 Karasuyamagami
 Kasagami
 Kashinishigami
 Kiryugami
 Koidegami
 Koyagami
 Kurotanigami (黒谷紙)
 Kyo Chiyogami (京千代紙)
 Kyo Karakami (京からかみ)

M
 Maniaigami
 Marumorigami
 Mashi
 Mimitsugami
 Mino Bijutsu Kogeishi (美濃美術工芸紙)
 Mino washi (美濃和紙) or Minogami (美濃紙)
 Misugami
 Miyachigami
 Miyamagami
 Momigami

N
 Najio Torinokogami
 Naogami
 Nishijima Gasenshi
 Nishi no Uchigami

O
 Obara Bijutsu Kogeishi
 Ogunigami
 Ohmi Ganpisi

S
 Sanchushi
 Sekishu Hanshi
 Senkashi
 Shinsatsushi
 Shiroishigami
 Shuzenjigami
 Sugiharagami or Suibaragami (杉原紙)
 Suruga Yunogami

T
 Tosa Bijutsu Kogeishi
 Tosa Shodō Yōshi (土佐書道用紙)
 Tosa Tengujyoshi (土佐典具帖紙)
 Tosa washi (土佐和紙) 
 Tozanshi
 Tsurutagami

U
 Udagami
 Uchiyama Shojigami
 Usuminogami (薄美濃紙)

W
 Wakasa Katasomegami

Y
 Yamegami
 Yanagifugami
 Yasudagami
 Yoshinogami

Visual arts materials
Arts-related lists
Japanese paper

ja:和紙#産地と和紙